The Biscuit Company Lofts is a 7-story building in Los Angeles, California. Built in 1925 as a factory, the building was converted to live/work lofts in 2006.

History
Conceived as the west coast headquarters for the National Biscuit Company, this landmark structure was designed by E.J. Eckel. Constructed in 1925 for a cost of 2 million dollars, this 7 story factory quickly became an architectural sensation.

In 2006, the building underwent a $25,000,000 renovation by Aleks Istanbullu Architects to convert the building to lofts. In 2007, developer Linear City LLC completed restoration of the property, part of the larger downtown L.A. gentrification effort that saw the repurposing of the area's mostly-abandoned industrial structures into 104 live/work lofts. Swinerton Builders operated as the general contractor on the renovation project.  Building amenities include a 24-hour doorman, a 75-foot-long saline swimming pool and a gym.

L.A.’s Office of Historic Resources declared the building an historic cultural monument in 2007. As a designated historical monument, the Biscuit Company Lofts qualifies for the Mills Act Program, a provision that offers homeowners an allowance on their annual property taxes.

In 2022, Justin Lin sold his 4,300 square penthouse atop the 7th floor of Biscuit Company Lofts for $5.5 million.

In popular culture
The building was featured in Downtown with Huell Howser.

Notable residents
 Nicolas Cage (2008) 
 Vincent Gallo (2009-2012)
 Justin Lin (2012–2022)
Michelle Shocked
David Willardson

Awards
2008: Chicago Title Renovated Buildings Award, Residential

References

External links

Buildings and structures in Downtown Los Angeles
Industrial buildings and structures in California
Residential buildings in Los Angeles
Residential buildings completed in 1925
1925 establishments in California